Chewiliken Creek is a stream in the U.S. state of Washington.

Chewiliken Creek was named after Chewiliken, a local Indian tribal leader.

See also
List of rivers of Washington

References

Rivers of Okanogan County, Washington
Rivers of Washington (state)